Sorana may refer to:
Sorana (Pescia), a village in Pistoia, Tuscany, Italy
Sorana bean, a type of cannellini bean grown in Sorana
Sorana Cîrstea (born 1990), Romanian tennis player
Sorana Păcurar (better known as only Sorana) Romanian singer and songwriter
Sorana Gurian (1913–1956), Moldovan writer and translator 
Marcia Servilia Sorana (c. 40s–66 AD), daughter of Roman Senator Barea Soranus, part of the Stoic Opposition 
Callicore sorana, a butterfly of genus Callicore

See also
Sora, Lazio, a town in Italy
Sorano, a town and comune in Grosseto, Tuscany, Italy
Sovana, a frazione of Sorano, once known as Soana
Sovana DOC, a wine produced in Sovana
Soraya, a female given name

Romanian feminine given names